Panyptila is a genus of swifts in the family Apodidae. The two species are found in Central and South America.

Taxonomy
The genus Panyptila was introduced in 1847 by the German ornithologist Jean Cabanis with the lesser swallow-tailed swift as the type species. The genus name combines the Ancient Greek panu meaning "very" or "exceedingly" with ptilon meaning "wing".

The genus contains two species:

 Great swallow-tailed swift (Panyptila sanctihieronymi)
 Lesser swallow-tailed swift (Panyptila cayennensis)

References

 
Bird genera
Taxonomy articles created by Polbot